Bill & Ted's Excellent Game Boy Adventure: A Bogus Journey! is an action-puzzle video game based on the Bill & Ted films  released by Acclaim Entertainment for the Game Boy in 1991.

Plot and gameplay 

Chuck De Nomolos has hatched another plan to alter history in his favor. He has stolen special orbs called Time Fragments and scattered them all across time. Now Bill and Ted must travel across time to retrieve the time fragments to prevent the future from altering. But it won't be easy for the San Dimas duo. As De Nomolos has the aid of the evil robot Bill and Ted, plus he has brainwashed Death and some historical figures to stop them along the way.

Each level takes place on a single screen. Players must collect scattered time fragments while jumping platforms, climbing ladders or ropes, and avoiding enemies. Because this is a Game Boy game, all sprites are very simplistic as both Bill and Ted have almost identical game sprites. In addition, enemies are only differentiated by their actions.

See also 
Bill & Ted's Excellent Video Game Adventure
Bill & Ted's Excellent Adventure (Atari Lynx video game)
Bill & Ted's Excellent Adventure (PC game)

References

External links 

1991 video games
Bill & Ted video games
Game Boy-only games
Platform games
Game Boy games
Video games developed in Australia